Dust is Benjy Davis Project's third studio album. It was released on September 18, 2007. Benjy Davis Project was soon signed to Rock Ridge Music in August 2008, and re-released Dust on November 4, 2008. The new release was remixed and included three new songs. The song "Sweet Southern Moon" was featured in an advertisement campaign for Louisiana-based Abita Brewing Company.

Track listing
All songs were composed by Benjy Davis, except as noted.

2007 Original Release
 "The Rain" - 4:21
 "I Love You" (Benjy Davis/Michael Galasso) - 3:38
 "Sweet Southern Moon" - 3:59
 "Clowns" (Davis/Galasso) - 4:21
 "Green And Blue" - 4:26
 "Good Enough" - 4:27
 "Prove You Wrong" - 4:32
 "Whose God?" - 3:51
 "When I Go Home" - 3:50
 "Fine With Me" - 4:16
 "Graves" - 2:56
 "Over Me" - 3:18

2008 Re-release
 "The Rain" - 4:21
 "Still Sweet" - 3:34
 "Sweet Southern Moon" - 3:59
 "Tell Myself" - 4:25
 "Green And Blue" - 4:26
 "I Love You" (Davis/Galasso) - 3:38
 "Good Enough" - 4:27
 "Same Damn Book" - 3:56
 "Whose God?" - 3:51
 "Clowns" (Davis/Galasso) - 4:21
 "When I Go Home" - 3:50
 "Graves" - 2:56
 "Over Me" - 3:18

Personnel
 Benjy Davis - Acoustic/Electric Guitar, Lead Vocals
 Mic Capdevielle - Percussion, Drums
 Brett Bolden - Bass Guitar (2007 Original Tracks)
 Michael Galasso - Harmonica, Piano, B3, Wurlitzer, Background Vocals
 Jonathan Lawhun - Electric Lead Guitar, Banjo
 Anthony Rushing - Mandolin, Violin, Background Vocals
 Matt Rusnak - Bass Guitar (2008 Additional Tracks)

Additional personnel
 Maggie Brown - Vocals

Benjy Davis Project albums
2007 albums